Dr. Jenő Kamuti (born September 17, 1937, in Budapest) is a former Hungarian foil fencer.

Fencing career
Kamut was a member of the Hungarian foil team from 1956 to 1976. He was World Team Champion in foil in 1957 and University World Champion for foil in 1959, 1961, 1963, and 1965. He was team and individual World silver medalist in foil in 1961, 1963, and 1967. He won the World Cup for foil in 1973. He was awarded the Pierre de Coubertin Trophy in 1976.

At the Olympics, he twice won individual silver medals in foil, at the 1968 Summer Olympics  and 1972 Summer Olympics.

Sports Diplomacy
He was a member of Executive Committee of International Fencing Federation (F.I.E.) 1986–2004 and  Secretary General of the F.I.E. 1992–96.
President of the European Fencing Confederation 1996–2005.
He has been a member of International Committee for Fair Play Administration Council since 1978 and President of the International Committee for Fair Play since 2000.
He was a member of the Medical Commission of the International Olympic Committee (IOC), 1992–2005
He has been Secretary General of Hungarian Olympic Committee since 2005.

Miscellaneous
He was surgeon (gastroenterologist) and Head Doctor at M.A.V. Hospital.

References

1937 births
Living people
Hungarian male foil fencers
Olympic fencers of Hungary
Fencers at the 1960 Summer Olympics
Fencers at the 1964 Summer Olympics
Fencers at the 1968 Summer Olympics
Fencers at the 1972 Summer Olympics
Fencers at the 1976 Summer Olympics
Olympic silver medalists for Hungary
Olympic medalists in fencing
Martial artists from Budapest
Medalists at the 1968 Summer Olympics
Medalists at the 1972 Summer Olympics
Universiade medalists in fencing
Universiade gold medalists for Hungary
Medalists at the 1959 Summer Universiade
Medalists at the 1961 Summer Universiade
Medalists at the 1963 Summer Universiade
Medalists at the 1965 Summer Universiade
20th-century Hungarian people
21st-century Hungarian people